Hindi University, is a non-affiliating Public State University in Howrah, West Bengal. The university was established in 2019 under The Hindi University Act, 2019. It became active with the appointment of the first vice-chancellor, Damodar Mishra, in 2021. Its first batch started in Narashingha Dutta College.The university building is under construction in Uttar Arupara near Kolkata Police Training Camp in Howrah.

See also
 List of universities in West Bengal
 Education in India
 Education in West Bengal

References

External links

Universities and colleges in Howrah district
Universities and colleges in West Bengal
Educational institutions established in 2021
Howrah district
2021 establishments in West Bengal
Hindi-language education